Erika Liebman (1738–1803) was a Swedish poet and academic. She was likely the first woman student at Lunds universitet.

She was the daughter of professor Reinhold Liebman at the Lund university and was allowed to attend class. She would thereby be counted as the first woman to have studied at a Swedish university. She continued her studies as an adult, which aroused great attention because of her gender.

In November 1756, she was published in Latin in Svenska Merkurius:

She married the vicar Magnus Sommar in Ingelstorp in 1761.

See also 
 Aurora Liljenroth
 Betty Pettersson

References

1738 births
1803 deaths
Swedish women poets
18th-century Swedish women writers
Lund University alumni
18th-century Swedish poets
Age of Liberty people